Arthur Klein (16 March 1889 Cleveland, Ohio – 6 June 1955 Los Angeles, California)  was an American racecar driver.

Klein was an aviator and an engineering officer in World War I, stationed in Issoudun, France. After retiring from racing, Klein later became the head of transportation for Warner Brothers studios, working there until his death.

Indianapolis 500 results

References

Indianapolis 500 drivers
1889 births
1955 deaths
AAA Championship Car drivers
Racing drivers from Ohio
Sportspeople from Cleveland